Islam Issa (born 1 February 1996), is an Egyptian footballer who plays for Egyptian Premier League side Pyramids as a winger.

Islam started his career with Al Nasr in youth level, but struggled to find a place in the first team after getting promoted. He joined Egyptian Third Division side Al Obour in 2016 on a free transfer, and returned to Al Nasr in the following year after showing great potential with the third division side. He plays for Pyramids in the Egyptian Premier League after agreeing on a transfer fee of £E10m (~$565k).

References

External links
Islam Issa at KOOORA.com

1996 births
Living people
People from Sharqia Governorate
Egyptian footballers
Association football wingers
Egyptian Premier League players
Al Nasr SC (Egypt) players
Al Masry SC players